Richard Adams (1791–1835) was a Scottish painter and architect, who built the Anglican Cathedral of St. John the Baptist of Buenos Aires.

Biography 

He was born in Scotland, and arrived in Buenos Aires in 1825, along with a group of Scottish settlers. His first job in Argentina was the construction of housing for the settlers in the Santa Catalina, (now Llavallol).

Richard Adams was the architect of the Cathedral of St. John the Baptist, the first Anglican temple of South America. He also built the Presbyterian Church of St. Andrew's for the Scottish community of Argentina.

References

External links 
mnba.gob.ar
museosvivos.educ.ar

1791 births
1835 deaths
Scottish emigrants to Argentina
Scottish painters
19th-century Scottish architects
Place of birth missing
Architects from Buenos Aires